Shahar Pe'er was the defending champion, but chose not to participate that year.

Jarmila Groth won her first WTA tour title, defeating Alla Kudryavtseva in the final 6–1, 6–4. Groth won the tournament without dropping a single set.

Seeds

Main draw

Finals

Top half

Bottom half

External links
 Main draw
 Qualifying draw

References 

Guangzhou International Women's Open - Singles
Guangzhou International Women's Open